Fools of Fate is a 1909 American drama film directed by  D. W. Griffith. A print of the film survives at the film archive of the Library of Congress.

Plot
A man's boat capsizes and another man who was camping nearby saves him before he drowns. After that the rescuer meets the almost drown man's wife without knowing who she is, they become friends but he starts to have feelings for her.

Cast
 James Kirkwood as Ben Webster
 Marion Leonard as Fanny Webster
 Frank Powell as Ed Hilton
 Henry B. Walthall
 William Beaudine as Extra (uncredited)

See also
 List of American films of 1909
 1909 in film
 D. W. Griffith filmography

References

External links

1909 films
Films directed by D. W. Griffith
American silent short films
Biograph Company films
American black-and-white films
1909 drama films
1909 short films
Silent American drama films
Films with screenplays by Frank E. Woods
1900s American films